Alejandro "Álex" Gallar Falguera (born 19 March 1992) is a Spanish footballer who plays for Málaga CF as either a left winger or a forward.

Club career
Born in Terrassa, Barcelona, Catalonia, Gallar was a Terrassa FC youth graduate. He made his senior debut on 8 December 2009, coming on as a second-half substitute in a 0–2 Segunda División B away loss against UE Lleida.

Gallar scored his first senior goal on 14 April 2010, netting his team's first in a 2–1 home win against Orihuela CF. On 19 June of that year he moved to RCD Mallorca, returning to youth football; he was promoted to the reserves ahead of the 2011–12 season.

On 2 August 2012, after being sparingly used, Gallar signed for another reserve team, Real Murcia Imperial in Tercera División. The following January, he moved to fellow league team UE Rubí.

On 28 May 2013, Gallar returned to Terrassa and the third division, after agreeing to a one-year deal. After spells at UE Cornellà and Hércules CF, he moved to Cultural y Deportiva Leonesa on 8 July 2016.

Gallar was a key unit in Cultu's promotion to Segunda División, scoring a career-best 20 goals. On 10 July 2017, he signed a three-year deal with SD Huesca in the second division, for a fee of €400,000.

Gallar made his professional debut on 19 August 2017, starting in a 0–1 loss at CD Numancia. His first goal came on 10 October, in a 1–1 home draw against CF Reus Deportiu; he ended the campaign as a starter, netting eight times as his side achieved a first-ever promotion to La Liga.

Gallar made his debut in the main category of Spanish football on 19 August 2018, starting and scoring a brace in a 2–1 away defeat of SD Eibar. He finished 2018–19 with four goals in 25 appearances (only ten starts, however), as his side was immediately relegated back.

On 21 August 2019, Gallar agreed to a four-year contract with Girona FC in the second level. On 25 September of the following year, he moved to fellow league team FC Cartagena on loan for the 2020–21 season; his loan with the Efesé was renewed for the 2021–22 campaign.

Gallar rescinded with Girona on 14 July 2022, and he signed a two-year deal with second division side Málaga CF the following day.

International career
In March 2019, Gallar was called up to the Catalonia representative team for a friendly against Venezuela. However, Huesca refused to let him and Enric Gallego take part in the match.

References

External links

1992 births
Living people
Footballers from Terrassa
Spanish footballers
Association football wingers
Association football forwards
La Liga players
Segunda División players
Segunda División B players
Tercera División players
UE Rubí players
Terrassa FC footballers
RCD Mallorca B players
Real Murcia Imperial players
UE Cornellà players
Hércules CF players
Cultural Leonesa footballers
SD Huesca footballers
Girona FC players
FC Cartagena footballers
Málaga CF players